Peter James Steinberger is a professor of political philosophy at Reed College. He was the thirteenth president of Reed College, preceding Colin Diver.
Steinberger has served on the Reed College faculty since 1977. While at Reed College, Steinberger has taught his classes primarily in the same room for 35 years. He has also authored editorial columns in both the local and national press, including The Oregonian, The Wall Street Journal, The Christian Science Monitor, and The New York Times.

Career

Early education 

 Ph.D. University of California, Riverside, 1976
 M.A.  Fordham University, 1972
 B.A. Fordham University, 1970

Positions held

 Dean of the Faculty, Reed College, 1997–2001, 2002–2010. 
 Acting President, Reed College, 2001-02 academic year. 
 Chair, Department of Political Science, Reed College, various terms between 1979 and 1990.

Books 

 Ideology and the Urban Crisis (Albany: State University of New York Press, 1985).
 Logic and Politics: Hegel's Philosophy of Right (New Haven and London: Yale University Press, 1988).
 The Concept of Political Judgment (Chicago and London: University of Chicago Press, 1993).
 The Idea of the State (Cambridge and New York: Cambridge University Press, 2005).
 The Problem With God (New York, Columbia University Press, 2013).
 The Politics of Objectivity (Cambridge: Cambridge University Press, 2015).

References

External links
 Curriculum Vitae
 Transcript of debate between Steinberger and David Horowitz on the Academic Bill of Rights

Living people
Year of birth missing (living people)
Reed College faculty